Children of the Corn III: Urban Harvest is a 1995 American slasher film, directed by James D. R. Hickox, and starring Daniel Cerny, Jim Metzler, Nancy Grahn, and Mari Morrow. It is the third film in the Children of the Corn series, and focuses on two mysterious brothers who are adopted from rural Nebraska and brought to Chicago; a chain of deadly occurrences surrounding the family follows, involving a cult in which the younger brother is a follower. Children of the Corn III marked the film debuts of Nicholas Brendon, Ivana Miličević, and Charlize Theron. Ed Grady reprises his role as Dr. Richard Appleby from the first sequel via a flashback sequence to Children of the Corn II: The Final Sacrifice.

The film was followed by an unrelated sequel, titled Children of the Corn IV: The Gathering (1996).

Plot
Eli and Joshua are being taken into foster care with William and Amanda Porter of Chicago after the death of their father, who was killed by Eli. The two boys do not mix well with a home in modern Chicago; their formal, Amish-like clothes from Gatlin, Eli's fire-and-brimstone prayer at dinner, and them bringing a suitcase full of corn to Chicago strike their new parents and neighbors as unusual. On his first night in Chicago, after everyone else has gone to sleep, Eli quietly leaves the Porters', taking his corn-filled suitcase, and heads to an empty factory on the other side of a nearby cornfield. There he prays to "He Who Walks Behind the Rows" and plants corn seeds on the factory grounds; rows of corn appear almost instantly.

The next day the boys start school, and Eli nearly gets into a fight with T-Loc, a student in Joshua's grade, and harshly criticizes Joshua for playing basketball with some of the other students. Disgusted with their classmates' modern lifestyle, Eli decides to bring He Who Walks Behind the Rows to Chicago, which soon kills a homeless man who finds the cornfield. Joshua makes friends with neighbors Maria and Malcolm and spends less time with Eli.

The social worker who brought Eli and Joshua to the Porters' discovers that Eli was originally adopted from Gatlin, Nebraska (the town from the first film) and that he has not aged since 1964. She tries to warn the Porters, but Eli quickly burns her alive. Amanda notices Eli's strange mannerisms, and when she tries to cut down his cornfield it attacks her. She attempts to escape, but she trips on a pole and her head is impaled on a broken pipe, killing her instantly. William finds the cornfield Eli has planted and realizes that with its seemingly-perfect nature invulnerable to disease, able to grow out-of-season and in the worst of soil, it could be a highly-marketable product. Despite his wife's death, which Eli arranged, William finds backers and looks forward to the massive profits Eli's strain of corn will bring.

Eli neglects to inform his foster father of another property the corn possesses: it turns children who eat it into followers of "He Who Walks Behind the Rows". Eli decisively sways his high-school classmates towards his beliefs, turning them against the principal and directing them to abandon basketball and other previously-typical activities. Alarmed at Eli's converting the students, the principal attempts to inform other staff, but they don't believe him, as Eli's efforts have actually restored order at the school to a degree few had thought possible.

By the time Joshua realizes the full truth, Eli has killed their foster parents, the school principal, and Malcolm and Maria's parents, and he now has full control of his fellow students. Joshua confronts him, revealing that he has gone back to Gatlin (which resulted in Malcolm's death) and found the Bible of "He Who Walks Behind the Rows" which Eli holds sacred and, together with his own body, can survive indefinitely if one is intact. Eli roars "Give me the book!" and charges. Joshua throws it down, and as Eli scrambles to pick it up Joshua stabs Eli and the book with a sickle, destroying both.

After Eli dies, "He Who Walks Behind the Rows" rises from the cornfield: a grotesque monster with several tentacles. It kills several of Eli's followers who have slipped from his control in horrific ways, including T-Loc. After a brief struggle, Joshua repeatedly stabs the sickle at the monster's lower body, which resembles a large tree root sticking out of the ground. "He Who Walks Behind the Rows" collapses and dies.

As the film closes, the first shipment of Eli's corn arrives in Germany, the beginning of shipments all over the world.

Cast

Daniel Cerny as Eli Porter
Ron Melendez as Joshua Porter
Michael Ensign as Father Frank Nolan
Jon Clair as Malcolm Elkman
Mari Morrow as Maria Elkman
Duke Stroud as Earl
Rance Howard as Employer
Brian Peck as Jake Witman
Nancy Lee Grahn as Amanda Porter
Ed Grady as Dr. Richard Appleby 
Jim Metzler as William Porter

Garvin Funches as T-Loc
Yvette Freeman as Samantha
Charlize Theron as Eli's follower (uncredited)
Ivana Miličević as Eli's follower/Acolyte 
Nicholas Brendon as Basketball Player One

Production
Filming began in December 1993 in Los Angeles, California, and ended on January 14, 1994.

Release

Home media
Children of the Corn III: Urban Harvest was the first film in the series made under Dimension Films and Miramax Films, who purchased the rights to the series and distributed the seven sequels to the original two films. It was also the first film in the series to be released direct-to-video, arriving at U.S. video stores on September 12, 1995 on VHS and DVD.

The film debuted on Blu-ray for the first time on May 10, 2011 via Echo Bridge Entertainment.

Reception
J.R. Taylor of Entertainment Weekly gave the film a B-rating: "This latest installment — the best of the Stephen King-derived series — offers some unexpected plot developments and surprisingly chilling gore. But fear not, it's unlikely Urban Harvest will cause nightmares, due to its hilariously inept climax. When the humongous corn creature shakes a screaming girl in its goo paws, the victim looks suspiciously like a Barbie doll". TV Guide awarded the film two out of five stars, praising the performances, and adding: "Against the odds, this horror series (initially based on a Stephen King short story) has actually improved over time to the point where this third installment is a creditable if far-fetched chiller".

See also
 Children of the Corn (film series)
 List of adaptations of works by Stephen King

References

External links
 
 

1995 films
Children of the Corn
1995 horror films
Children of Corn 3
Miramax films
Dimension Films films
Direct-to-video sequel films
Direct-to-video horror films
Films about cults
Films about religion
American slasher films
1990s English-language films
Films set in Chicago
Films scored by Daniel Licht
Films directed by James D. R. Hickox
1990s American films